Major Nameye Khadija popularly known with his stage name Mejja is a Kenyan Genge artist. He was signed to Calif Records where he released multiple collaborations. His single "Jana Kuliendaje" won him an award at Kenya's Chaguo la Teeniz in 2008

Career
Mejja started singing in primary school with his brother Wambugu. Together they had formed a group called Ghetto Clan. 
In 2008 Mejja had his first breakthrough song titled ‘Jana Kuliendaje’. In 2011, Mejja released a song dubbed "Landlord" which put him in the spotlight.

In 2014, Mejja formed a group called "The Kansoul" together with Kid Kora, and Madtraxx. The group dropped their first song ‘Dabo Tap’ later that year.

In 2020, Mejja was in many collaborations including "Cheza Kama Wewe" by Trio Mio and "Utawezana" by Femi One

He featured in Bensoul hit "Nairobi" alongside Sauti Sol in 2021.

Discography
Songs 
Bongo la biashara 
Jana Kuliendaje
Landlord
Nyongwa
Double Tap
Niko Poa
Twenzetu ft Madtraxx
Ulimi Yangu
Siskii
siku hizi ni kubad
Kanairo Dating

References

21st-century Kenyan musicians
Kenyan musicians
Living people
1979 births